Tulloch Dam is a hydroelectric dam on the Stanislaus River in central California. The dam is part of the Stanislaus River Tri-Dam project cooperatively owned by the Oakdale and South San Joaquin Irrigation Districts, and was completed in 1958. It serves mainly for irrigation purposes but also has a power station with a capacity of 18 megawatts. The dam is located just downstream of the New Melones Dam and upstream of the Goodwin Dam.

See also

 Beardsley Dam
 Donnells Dam
 List of dams and reservoirs in California
 List of lakes in California

References

Dams in California
Dams on the Stanislaus River
Buildings and structures in Calaveras County, California
Buildings and structures in Tuolumne County, California
Hydroelectric power plants in California
United States local public utility dams
Dams completed in 1958
Energy infrastructure completed in 1958